This is a list of estrogen esters, or ester prodrugs of estrogens. It includes esters, as well as ethers, of steroidal estrogens like estradiol, estrone, and estriol and of nonsteroidal estrogens like the stilbestrols diethylstilbestrol and hexestrol.

Esters of steroidal estrogens

Estradiol esters

Marketed
Many esters of estradiol have been marketed, including the following major esters:

 Estradiol acetate (Femring, Femtrace, Menoring)
 Estradiol benzoate (Agofollin Depot, Progynon-B; Duogynon, Primosiston, Sistocyclin)
 Estradiol cypionate (Depo-Estradiol, Depofemin, Estradep; Cyclofem, Lunelle)
 Estradiol dipropionate (Agofollin, Di-Ovocyclin, Progynon-DP; EP Hormone Depot)
 Estradiol enantate (Perlutal, Topasel, Unalmes, Yectames)
 Estradiol undecylate (Delestrec, Progynon Depot)
 Estradiol valerate (Delestrogen, Progynon Depot, Progynova; Gravibinon, Mesigyna, Mesygest)
 Polyestradiol phosphate (Estradurin) (an estradiol ester in polymeric form)

And the following less commonly used esters:

 Cloxestradiol acetate (Genovul; diacetate ester of cloxestradiol, or estradiol 17β-chloral hemiacetal ether)
 Estradiol benzoate butyrate (Redimen, Soluna, Unijab, Unimens)
 Estradiol butyrylacetate (Follikoside)
 Estradiol dibutyrate (Triormon Depositum)
 Estradiol dienantate (Climacteron, Lactimex, Lactostat)
 Estradiol diundecylate (Estrolent; Trioestrine Retard)
 Estradiol diundecylenate (Etrosteron)
 Estradiol furoate (Di-Folliculine)
 Estradiol hemisuccinate (Eutocol; Hosterona)
 Estradiol hexahydrobenzoate (Benzo-Ginoestril A.P., BenzoGynoestryl Retard, Ginestryl-15-Depot, Menodin, Tardoginestryl)
 Estradiol palmitate (Esmopal)
 Estradiol phenylpropionate (Dimenformon Prolongatum; Estandron Prolongatum, Lynandron Prolongatum, Mixogen)
 Estradiol pivalate (Estrotate; Estrotate with Progesterone)
 Estradiol propionate (estradiol 17β-propionate) (Acrofollin, Akrofollin, Follhormon)
 Estradiol propoxyphenylpropionate (Durovex)
 Estradiol stearate (Depofollan)
 Estradiol sulfate (a minor constituent of conjugated estrogens (Premarin))

The following nitrogen mustard ester of estradiol is a cytostatic antineoplastic agent and has been marketed:

 Estramustine phosphate (Emcyt, Estracyt; estradiol 3-normustine 17β-phosphate)

Never marketed
A number of other estradiol esters which have not been marketed include:

 Estradiol 3-furoate
 Estradiol 3-propionate (not to be confused with estradiol monopropionate (estradiol 17β-propionate))
 Estradiol 17β-(1-(4-(aminosulfonyl)benzoyl)--proline) (EC508)
 Estradiol acetate benzoate
 Estradiol 17β-acetate
 Estradiol 17β-benzoate
 Estradiol acetylsalicylate (estradiol 3-acetylsalicylate)
 Estradiol anthranilate (estradiol 3-anthranilate)
 Estradiol arachidonate
 Estradiol benzoate cyclooctenyl ether (estradiol 3-benzoate 17β-cyclooctenyl ether; EBCO)
 Estradiol caprylate (estradiol octanoate)
 Estradiol cyclooctyl acetate (E2CoA)
 Estradiol decanoate (estradiol 17β-decanoate)
 Estradiol diacetate
 Estradiol dibenzoate
 Estradiol dicypionate
 Estradiol dioleate
 Estradiol dipalmitate
 Estradiol distearate
 Estradiol disulfate
 Estradiol glucuronide
 Estradiol sulfate glucuronide
 Estradiol linoleate
 Estradiol oleate
 Estradiol phosphate
 Estradiol salicylate (estradiol 3-salicylate)
 Estradiol sulfamate (E2MATE; J995, PGL-2, PGL-2001, ZK-190628; estradiol-3-O-sulfamate)
 Estradiol undecylenate (SH-368)
 Estrapronicate (estradiol 3-propionate 17β-nicotinate; Trophobolene, Trophoboline)
 Orestrate (estradiol 3-propionate 17β-(1-cyclohexenyl) ether)

The following cytostatic antineoplastic nitrogen mustard esters of estradiol have not been marketed:

 Alestramustine (estradiol 3-(bis(2-chloroethyl)carbamate), 17-ester with L-alanine)
 Atrimustine (KM-2210; bestrabucil, busramustine)
 Estradiol mustard (NSC-112259; chlorphenacyl estradiol diester)
 Estramustine (Leo 275; Ro 21-8837)
 Estromustine (Leo 271 f; estrone 17β-3-N-bis(2-chloroethyl)carbamate, estrone–cytostatic complex)

Estrone esters

Marketed
Esters of estrone that have been marketed include:

 Estrone acetate (Hovigal)
 Estrone sulfate (as the primary component of conjugated estrogens (Premarin))
 Estropipate (Ogen, Ortho-Est) (a salt of estrone sulfate and piperazine)
 Estrone tetraacetylglucoside (Glucovex, Glycovex)

Never marketed
Other estrone esters which are notable but have not been marketed include:

 Estrone benzoate
 Estrone cyanate
 Estrone enanthate
 Estrone enanthate benzilic acid hydrazone
 Estrone glucuronide
 Estrone phosphate
 Estrone propionate
 Estrone sulfamate (EMATE; J994; estrone-3-O-sulfamate)
 Estrone oleate

Estriol esters

Marketed
Esters of estriol that have been marketed include:

 Estriol 3-glucuronide (as a component of conjugated estriol (Emmenin, Progynon))
 Estriol acetate benzoate (Holin-Depot)
 Estriol glucuronide (as a component of conjugated estriol (Emmenin, Progynon))
 Estriol succinate (Sinapause, Styptanon, Synapause)
 Estriol sodium succinate (Pausan, Styptanon)
 Estriol sulfate (as a component of conjugated estriol (Emmenin, Progynon))
 Estriol sulfate glucuronide (as a component of conjugated estriol (Emmenin, Progynon))
 Estriol tripropionate (Estriel)
 Polyestriol phosphate (Gynäsan, Klimadurin, Triodurin)  (an estriol ester in polymeric form)

Never marketed
The following ester of estriol was never marketed:

 Estriol dihexanoate
 Estriol dipropionate
 Estriol phosphate (E3P)
 Estriol sulfamate (E3MATE; J1034; estriol-3-O-sulfamate)
 Estriol triacetate

Ethinylestradiol esters

Marketed
The following esters of ethinylestradiol exist and have been marketed:

 Ethinylestradiol sulfonate (Turisteron; ethinylestradiol 3-isopropylsulfonate)

Never marketed
 Ethinylestradiol benzoate – the 3-benzoate ester of ethinylestradiol
 Ethinylestradiol N,N-diethylsulfamate (J271) – the 3-(N,N-diethyl)sulfamate ester of ethinylestradiol
 Ethinylestradiol pyrrolidinosulfonate (J272) – the 3-pyrrolidinosulfonate ester of ethinylestradiol
 Ethinylestradiol sulfamate (J1028) – the 3-sulfamate ester of ethinylestradiol
 Ethinylestradiol sulfate

Esters of other steroidal estrogens

Marketed
The following esters of other estrogens exist and have been marketed:

 Hydroxyestrone diacetate (Colpoginon, Colpormon, Hormobion, Hormocervix) – the 3,16α-diacetate ester of 16α-hydroxyestrone

Ethers of steroidal estrogens

Marketed
A number of estrogen ethers also exist and have been marketed, including:

 Clomestrone (Arterolo, Atheran, Colesterel, Iposclerone, Liprotene, Persclerol) – the 3-methyl ether of 16α-chloroestrone
 Cloxestradiol acetate (Genovul) – the O,O-diacetate ester of cloxestradiol (estradiol 17β-chloral hemiacetal ether)
 Mestranol (Devocin, Ovastol, Tranel) (component of Enovid, Enavid, Ortho-Novin, Femigen, Norbiogest) – the 3-methyl ether of ethinylestradiol
 Moxestrol (Surestryl) – the 11β-methoxy derivative of ethinylestradiol (and hence the 11β-methyl ether of the 11β-hydroxyl derivative of ethinylestradiol)
 Nilestriol (Wei Ni An) – the 3-cyclopentyl ether of ethinylestriol
 Promestriene (Colpotrofin, Colpotrophine, Delipoderm) – the 3-propyl and 17β-methyl diether of estradiol
 Quinestradol (Colpovis, Colpovister, Pentovis) – the 3-cyclopentyl ether of estriol
 Quinestrol (Agalacto-Quilea, Basaquines, Eston, Estrovis, Estrovister, Plestrovis, Qui-lea) – the 3-cyclopentyl ether of ethinylestradiol

Never marketed
A few other estrogen ethers which are notable but have not been marketed include:

 Cloxestradiol – the 17β-chloral hemiacetal ether of estradiol
 Estradiol benzoate cyclooctenyl ether – the 17β-cyclooctenyl ether of estradiol 3-benzoate
 Estradiol 3-saccharinylmethyl ether – the 3-(saccharinylmethyl) ether of estradiol
 Estradiol 3-tetrahydropyranyl ether – the 3-(tetrahydropyran-2-yl) ether of estradiol
 Estradiol 17β-tetrahydropyranyl ether – the 17β-(tetrahydropyran-2-yl) ether of estradiol
 Estrone methyl ether – the 3-methyl ether of estrone
 Mytatrienediol – the 3-methyl ether of 16α-methyl-16β-epiestriol
 Orestrate – the 17β-(1-cyclohexenyl) ether of estradiol 3-propionate

Esters of nonsteroidal estrogens

Diethylstilbestrol esters

Marketed
Major esters of diethylstilbestrol include:

 Diethylstilbestrol dipropionate (Agostilben, Biokeral, Clinestrol, Cyclen, Estilbin, Estril, Neobenzoestrol, Orestol, Oroestrol, Ostregenin, Prostilbene, Stilbestriol DP, Stilboestrolum Dipropionicum, Stilboestrol, Synestrin, Willestrol)
 Fosfestrol (diethylstilbestrol diphosphate) (Honvan, Difostilben, Fosfostilben, Fostrolin, Stilbol, Stilphostrol, Vagestrol)

Less commonly used esters of diethylstilbestrol include:

 Diethylstilbestrol diacetate (Hormostilboral Stark)
 Diethylstilbestrol dilaurate (Acnestrol-Lotion)
 Diethylstilbestrol dipalmitate (stilpalmitate) (Palmestril, Stilpalmitate)
 Diethylstilbestrol disulfate (Hydroestryl, Idroestril)

Never marketed
 Diethylstilbestrol sulfate
 Furostilbestrol (diethylstilbestrol difuroate)
 Polydiethylstilbestrol phosphate

As well as the following nitrogen mustard ester:

 ICI-85966 (Stilbostat; diethylstilbestrol bis(di(2-chloroethyl)carbamate))

Hexestrol esters

Marketed
 Hexestrol diacetate (Retalon Lingual, Robal, Sintestrol, Sintofolin)
 Hexestrol dicaprylate (dioctanoylhexestrol) (Taston)
 Hexestrol diphosphate (Cytostesin, Pharmestrin, Retalon Aquosum)
 Hexestrol dipropionate (Hexanoestrol, Retalon Oleosum)
 Hexestrol phosphate (Retalon Aquosum)

Never marketed
The following nitrogen mustard ester of hexestrol was never marketed:

 Phenestrol (fenestrol; hexestrol bis[4-[bis(2-chloroethyl)amino]phenylacetate)

Esters of other nonsteroidal estrogens

Marketed
 Dienestrol diacetate (Faragynol, Gynocyrol)
 Methestrol dipropionate (promethestrol dipropionate, dimethylhexestrol dipropionate) (Meprane Dipropionate)

Ethers of nonsteroidal estrogens

Diethylstilbestrol

Marketed
 Diethylstilbestrol monobenzyl ether (benzelstilbestrol) (Monozol, Hypantin, Pituitrope)
 Dimestrol (dianisylhexene, diethylstilbestrol dimethyl ether, dimethoxydiethylstilbestrol) (Depot-Ostromon, Synthila)
 Mestilbol (diethylstilbestrol monomethyl ether) (Monomestro or Monomestrol)

See also
 List of estrogens
 List of progestogen esters
 List of androgen esters
 List of combined sex-hormonal preparations

References

Estrogen esters
Estrogens
Prodrugs